Ingvar Bengtsson (born 2 January 1955) is a Swedish sailor. He competed in the Finn event at the 1984 Summer Olympics.

References

External links
 

1955 births
Living people
Swedish male sailors (sport)
Olympic sailors of Sweden
Sailors at the 1984 Summer Olympics – Finn
Sportspeople from Gothenburg